Mal Taman Anggrek, translated to "Orchid Garden Mall" in English (also known as MTA or TA), is a shopping mall in Grogol Petamburan, West Jakarta, Indonesia. The mall is named after a real orchid garden within the now-demolished Orchid Hotel site, which occupied the building site prior to construction; that orchid garden has since been relocated near Taman Mini Indonesia Indah.

The retail podium was the largest shopping center in Southeast Asia when it first opened in 1996, up until the opening of Berjaya Times Square in Kuala Lumpur in 2003. It remains one of the largest malls in Indonesia. The mall is nestled within eight condominium towers and its Plaza Level (PL), known as the Kondominium Taman Anggrek. The mall houses more than 500 specialized stores, spread within seven floors.

Throughout the complex, there are more than 20 exhibition areas, including an  center atrium which hosts major events and exhibitions, such as the ASEAN Countdown 2000. The mall also boasts Southeast Asia's oldest running indoor ice rink, the  sized Skyrink Jakarta, which was officially opened on August 20, 1997. Taman Anggrek also hosts a  LED facade, which once held the Guinness World Record for the world's largest illuminated LED facade when completed in 2012. In January 2017, Mal Taman Anggrek was also recognized by Forbes as one of the top shopping malls in Jakarta.

During its inception in 1994, the Indonesian-based Mulia Group under Mulialand entered a joint venture with Peter Gontha's PT Sinar Estetika and Titiek Soeharto's PT Maharani Paramitra to create Mulia Intipelangi, Mulialand's subsidiary as well as developer/manager of the Taman Anggrek complex. The Taman Anggrek complex, both condominiums, and mall, was designed by Altoon + Porter Architects (now Stir Architecture).

In 2022, to replace several departing major and small retailers (like Metro Department Store, Zara, Gramedia, and Sephora), Mal Taman Anggrek welcomed 3 anchor tenants and several other replacement tenants - such as IKEA, the returning Matahari, and Electronic City. IKEA debuted their first city store concept in Indonesia in a 9400 sqm space covering two floors (level 3 and 4) and housing 3 food & beverage concepts (Restoran Swedia, Kafe Swedia, and Bistro Swedia), groundbreaking on 28 October 2021 and grand opening on 7 April 2022. Matahari Department Store officially returned on Thursday, 14 April 2022.

Tenants

Current tenants 
Anchor Tenants: IKEA (L3-L4), Matahari (UG-L1), Fitness First (L4-P6), Cinema XXI (L3-L4), Decathlon (L1), Uniqlo (UG), Ace Hardware (L2), Hero Supermarket (P2), Skyrink Jakarta (L3)

Major Specialty Tenants: Electronic City (G), KKV (L2), Sports Station (L1), Forever 21 (UG), Erafone (L3), Planet Sports (L1), Batik Keris (G), Giordano (G), Kidz Station (L2), Planet Surf (L2), Toys Kingdom (L1), Miniso (G)

Major Entertainment Tenants: Fun World (L3), Apple Bee Kids Playground (G)

Major Food & Beverage Tenants: LimaLima Food Court, Haidilao

Retail Tenants: Montblanc, Nautica, Adidas, Arena, Crocs, Kettler, Polo, Puma, Skechers, The Athlete's Foot, Mondial Jewelers, Frank & Co., The Palace National Jeweler, Belva Jewellery, Emperor Jewellery, MBJewellery, Glory Jewellery, Golden Eiffel, Logam Tunggal, Swan Jewellery, Swing Watch, Optik Melawai Gallery, Optik Seis, Optik Tunggal, Kosé, L'Occitane en Provence, Nature Republic, The Body Shop, The Face Shop, Tony Moly, Martha Tilaar Shop, Mothercare, Early Learning Center, Asus - Microsoft, Huawei, Samsung Experience Shop, Vivo, Digimap, Guardian, GNC, Watsons, Century Healthcare, Ariston, Rinnai, Simmons & Airland, Cellini Design Center, Saint James Hankook Ceramic, Sleep & Co., Sleep Center, Tecnogas, EF English First, Hyundai City Store, etc.

Food & Beverage Tenants: Starbucks, The Coffee Bean & Tea Leaf, J.CO Donuts, Din Tai Fung Chef's Table, Pizza Hut, Yoshinoya, BreadTalk, Bee Cheng Hiang, KOI Thé, Fore Coffee, Baskin-Robbins, A&W, KFC, Saint Cinnamon, Monsieur Spoon, Acaii Tea, Bakmi GM, Fiesta Steak, D'Crepes, Hong Kong Sheng Kee Dessert, Pho Street, Sate Khas Senayan, Ramen Seirock-ya, Steak 21 Buffet, Sushi Hiro, Ta Wan, Toast Box, Old Town White Coffee, Tous Les Jours, Truedan, etc.

Former tenants 
Alongside current tenants, Mal Taman Anggrek has had an array of former tenants in different specialties since its opening in 1996, such as former anchors JCPenney Collections (international franchise of JCPenney) from 1996 to late 1997, the now-defunct middle-end Rimo Department Store flagship from 1996 to 2006 (occupying two levels first before expanding into three levels in 1999), and Marks & Spencer was also an anchor in the mall when it first opened with a 3000-square-meter flagship store (the largest store in Asia) that closed in 1999 in the midst of Mark & Spencer's switch of Indonesian franchisee, before moving into a two-level store in 2001, downsizing in the late 2000s, and finally closing in the mid-2010s. Local middle-low clothing store Pojok Busana also enjoyed its presence as an anchor, from 1996 until the early 2000s. The Gramedia bookstore closed its Taman Anggrek anchor space in 2020, after opening in 1999, while Metro Department Store closed its Taman Anggrek anchor space in January 2022 (after downsizing their store in 2018), 20 years after its opening in February 2002.

Aside from the former anchors, there were also multiple entertainment vendors which had opened in Mal Taman Anggrek, such as the SS Dunia Main Sega arcade, Timezone (which from 1996 until 2018 opened in various locations within the mall, such as inside Megakidz and in two separate levels), the Inul Vizta Karaoke bar, and two children daycares, Gymboree and Tumble Tots. Laser Quest is also noted to have once opened an outlet in the mall, along with a virtual reality center during the 1990s. More recently, the children's playground Little Boss Play & Eat has closed due to the COVID-19 pandemic.

Alongside the former anchors and entertainment, vendors were multiple major specialty stores, such as the Furnicenter, Agis Elektronik, Toko Gunung Agung, Karisma Modern Bookshop, Electronic Solution, and Tarra Megastore (a record shop that occasionally hosted press conferences for international artists coming to Jakarta, such as Stephen Gately in July 2000 and the A1 boyband in March 2001). More notable major tenants were the Warner Bros. Studio Store (which opened in January 1997), a Toyota showroom, a Mercedes-Benz showroom, Mango, La Senza, Zara (their first store in West Jakarta when it opened in 2006), and Sephora (opening in 2016 and closing late 2021).

Numerous international labels ranging from middle to upper segments have also opened in Mal Taman Anggrek, such as Tirta (casualwear collection of Iwan Tirta), Replay Country Store, Club Monaco, BOSS Hugo Boss, Aigner, Inscription Sonia Rykiel, Lacoste, Folli Follie, Mandarina Duck, Springfield Menswear, Linea Pelle, Chomel, Benetton, Paul Smith, Aldo, Guess, Guess Accessories, Ellesse Italia, Levi's, Clarks, Nine West, OshKosh B'gosh, Timberland, Rockport, Ocean Pacific, O'Neill, Pony International, Royal Elastics, Quiksilver, Chicco, Yves Rocher, Bata, Crocodile, VNC (Indonesian retailer of Vincci), Swatch, Steve Madden, Charles & Keith (one of their first two international boutiques when opening in 1998), Pedro, Tracce, and Everbest. Many fast fashion brands have also opened up shop throughout the years, such as Bossini, Esprit, Next, G2000, and U2. Many of these labels were flagship stores (such as Guess and Charles & Keith) and first stores in Indonesia (such as Inscription Sonia Rykiel, Mandarina Duck, O'Neill, Rockport, Pony International, Royal Elastics, VNC, and more).

Aside from specialty shops, many local and international food outlets have opened in Mal Taman Anggrek. La Brioche Dorée, Pizza Del Arte, Hartz Chicken Buffet, Samudra Seafood & Suki Restaurant are some of the 97 original food-and-beverage outlets which opened during Mal Taman Anggrek's early years of operations. Sizzler (later renamed American Grill due to an expired franchise license), Subway, HokBen, Da Niang Dumpling, Thai Express, Nando's, Jollibee, Popeyes, McDonald's, Eaton, Yogen Früz, Dunkin' Donuts, Arby's, Wendy's, and Nando's have also once opened an outlet here.

History of Matahari Group at Mal Taman Anggrek 
The Indonesian retail holding group, Matahari Department Store Tbk., has a lengthy history with Mal Taman Anggrek. Located at the North Wing of the mall, their first two concepts in the mall were first opened on 19 October 1996 - the Galeria Department Store and MegaKids. Dedicated to upper-end customers with a collection of brands such as Kenzo and Balenciaga, the 11.967 sqm, three-leveled Galeria store was located on the ground floor to the first floor of the mall - which also had a separate lobby. MegaKids, a children's goods megastore located on the second floor (right above Galeria), had fashion merchandise for children with in-house brands such as Little M and toys, along with a Timezone arcade (their first location in the mall before moving to the former SS Mega Dunia Main Sega on the third floor and opening another outlet that was more kids-oriented on the second floor), a Laser Quest, and an Alfa Zona soft-play playground - all in a 4557 sqm space. Another children's good store concept by Matahari, Kids2Kids, also opened a store in the mall's ground floor. Galeria and Mega M rebranded as Matahari, with all remaining outlets throughout Sumatera and Java being converted to the Matahari brand by 2003, but the Galeria and Megakidz brands continued to operate as such in Mal Taman Anggrek.

Both Galeria and Megakidz were then redesigned as the upmarket Parisian Department Store in 2007, with a grand opening celebration held on 18 March 2008. The Parisian Department Store contained many luxury beauty and fashion brands, mostly coming from South Korea, Brazil, Malaysia, Thailand, and Hongkong - such as La Mer, Sulwhasoo, Tara Jarmon, Rock & Republic, Triumph, It. Michaa, Jack n Jill, Line by Lynn, Kenneth Lady, Poleci, Chaps, Phenomenal, Mocca, J-West, and Rabeanco. However, the Parisian concept didn't last long, as it saw the dilution of the Parisian brand into Matahari Department Store's New Generation concept, following its opening at Supermall Karawaci and Pluit Village in 2008. The store eventually closed on 3 December 2017, and Mal Taman Anggrek renovated the space alongside the upper levels of the mall's north wing, with Haidilao, IKEA, and various F&B and lifestyle tenants filling it.

In 2022, Matahari announced their return to Mal Taman Anggrek, replacing Metro Department Store. Their new concept store in Mal Taman Anggrek has a new 'flagship signature' concept, and opened on 14 April 2022. The 8200 sqm leased space has retail space of around 7835 sqm and houses 200 brands, featuring hign-end to middle-end cosmetics, fragrances, and lotion skincare, with a corner curated by local multi-brand cosmetics store Sociolla. Their new space also takes over space formerly occupied by Guess Accessories, Swatch, and other tenants. Since its opening, Mal Taman Anggrek became a place for Matahari to conduct events, including its 2022 lucky draw on 24 June and recently, Matahari's new logo launch on 8 October.

Awards
World's Largest LED Illuminated Facade – Guinness World Records

International Council of Shopping Centers (ICSC) Global Awards 2014 – Finalist

International Council of Shopping Centers (ICSC) Global Awards 2013 – Finalist

Gallery

See also

 List of shopping malls in Indonesia
 List of largest shopping malls in the world

References

Shopping malls in Jakarta
Residential skyscrapers in Indonesia
West Jakarta